Interim Capability for Airborne Networking (ICAN) is a capability of the United States Air Force that enables secure airborne communication built by Northrop Grumman. ICAN was the precursor of the Joint Capability for Airborne Networking.

External links
Northrop Grumman - Joint Capability for Airborne Networking

Equipment of the United States Air Force